General elections were held in Italy on 26 March 1934. At the time, the country was a single-party state with the National Fascist Party (PNF) as the only legally permitted party.

Following a parliamentary reform enacted in 1928 by the Chamber of Deputies and Senate, the elections were held in the form of a referendum, with the Grand Council of the PNF, now an official state organ, allowed to compose a single party list to be either approved or rejected by the voters. The list put forward was ultimately approved by 99.84% of voters. The overwhelming majority provoked Benito Mussolini to dub the election the "second referendum of Fascism."

These would be the last elections of any sort held under Fascist rule. In 1939, the Chamber of Deputies was replaced with the Chamber of Fasces and Corporations, whose members were not elected but instead nominated by party organs.

Background
In 1929 a concordat with the Vatican was signed, ending decades of struggle between the Italian state and the Papacy that dated back to the 1870 takeover of the Papal States by the House of Savoy during the unification of Italy. The Lateran treaties, by which the Italian state was at last recognized by the Roman Catholic Church, and the independence of Vatican City was recognized by the Italian state, was so much appreciated by the ecclesiastic hierarchy that Pope Pius XI acclaimed Mussolini as "the Man of Providence".

During 1930s Mussolini also lead the armed local fascist militia, the MVSN or "Blackshirts", who terrorized incipient resistances in the cities and provinces and established the OVRA, an institutionalized secret police that carried official state support. In this way he succeeded in keeping power in his own hands and preventing the emergence of any rival.

After Adolf Hitler came into power, threatening Italian interests in Austria and the Danube basin, Mussolini proposed the Four Power Pact with Britain, France and Germany in 1933. When the Austrian 'austro-fascist' Chancellor Engelbert Dollfuss with dictatorial power was assassinated on 25 July 1934, by National-Socialist supporters, Mussolini even threatened Germany with war in the event of a German invasion of Austria. Mussolini for a period of time continued strictly opposing any German attempt to obtain Anschluss and promoted the ephemeral Stresa Front against Germany in 1935.

Electoral system

As for the 1929 election, universal male suffrage was restricted only to men who were members of a trade union or an association, to soldiers and to members of the clergy

The election was a plebiscite; voters could vote "Yes" or "No" to approve or disapprove the list of deputies nominated by the Grand Council of Fascism. The voter was provided with two equal-sized sheets, white outside, inside bearing the words "Do you approve the list of members appointed by the Grand National Council of Fascism?" The "Yes" ballot paper was decorated with the Italian tricolour and a fasces, the "No" paper was plain.

The voter would be presented with both ballot papers, choosing one of the two and discarding the other in the voting booth. He would then fold over his chosen paper and present it to the electoral officials to ensure it was sealed. The process would not be considered free and fair by modern standards.

If the "No" option had won, the election would be repeated with the admission of other electoral lists.

Results

References

General elections in Italy
Italy
General
Italy
Italy
One-party elections
Referendums in Italy
Single-candidate elections